Løkken Station is a former railway station that was the southern terminus of the old Thamshavn Line. It is located in the village of Løkken Verk in the present-day municipality of Orkland in Trøndelag county, Norway.

References

Orkland
Railway stations in Trøndelag
Railway stations on the Thamshavn Line
Railway stations opened in 1908
Railway stations closed in 1963
Disused railway stations in Norway
1908 establishments in Norway
1963 disestablishments in Norway